Daniela Pejšová (born 14 August 2002) is a Czech ice hockey player and member of the Czech national team, currently playing in the Swedish Women's Hockey League (SDHL) with Luleå_HF/MSSK.

Pejšová represented the Czech Republic at the IIHF Women's World Championships in 2019 and 2021. As a junior player with the Czech national under-18 team, she participated in the IIHF Women's U18 World Championships in 2018, 2019, and 2020.

References

External links
 
 Daniela Pejšová at Hokej.cz 

2002 births
Living people
Czech expatriate ice hockey players in Sweden
Czech women's ice hockey defencemen
Modo Hockey Dam players
People from Teplice
Olympic ice hockey players of the Czech Republic
Ice hockey players at the 2022 Winter Olympics
Sportspeople from the Ústí nad Labem Region
Universiade medalists in ice hockey
Medalists at the 2023 Winter World University Games
Universiade bronze medalists for the Czech Republic